Helena of Austria (German: Helena von Österreich; 7 January 1543 – 5 March 1574) was a co-founder of the Ladies' Convent of Hall (Haller Damenstift), born an archduchess of Austria from the House of Habsburg as the daughter of Ferdinand I, Holy Roman Emperor.

Life

Early life 
Archduchess Helena of Austria was born in Vienna in the Archduchy of Austria on 16 February 1536 as the fourteenth child and tenth daughter of Ferdinand I, Holy Roman Emperor (1503–1564) and his wife, born Princess Anna of Bohemia and Hungary (1503–1547). She had a strict, religious upbringing with a heavy influence from Jesuits.

Life as a nun 
Due to her frail health, her father considered her unfit for marriage, so she became a nun in Hall in Tirol, County of Tyrol, founding the Ladies' Convent of Hall (Haller Damenstift) under the supervision of the Society of Jesus with her older sisters Archduchesses Magdalena (1532–1590) and Margaret (1536–1567) of Austria. She died there on 5 March 1574 at the age of 31, and was buried in the local Jesuit Church (Jesuitenkirche).

Notes

References
 Constantin von Wurzbach: Habsburg, Helene. N°. 111 in: Biographisches Lexikon des Kaiserthums Oesterreich. vol 6. ed. L. C. Zamarski, Vienna 1860, p. 277 online.
 Ferdinand Leopold, Freiherr von Biedenfeld: Ursprung, Aufleben ... und jetzige Zustände sämmtlicher Mönchs- und Klosterfrauen-Orden im Orient und Occident. 1837, p. 332 online

1543 births
1574 deaths
Daughters of emperors
16th-century House of Habsburg
16th-century Austrian women
16th-century Roman Catholic nuns
Austrian princesses
Hungarian princesses
Bohemian princesses
Children of Ferdinand I, Holy Roman Emperor
Daughters of kings
Nobility from Vienna
Austrian Roman Catholic religious sisters and nuns